Santa Mira may refer to:

Fictional places
Santa Mira, California is the name of a fictional California town in the following science fiction or horror works:

Invasion of the Body Snatchers, a 1956 film based on the 1955 novel
E.T. the Extra-Terrestrial, a 1982 movie
Halloween III: Season of the Witch, a 1982 film
Phantoms (novel), a 1983 novel
Airwolf, a 1984–87 TV series
Death of a Cheerleader, a 1994 Lifetime movie
Memoirs of an Invisible Man (film), a 1992 film
A Friend to Die For, a 1994 TV movie
First Frontier, a 1994 novel 
The Dark Tower VII: The Dark Tower, a 2004 novel
Ben 10: Alien Force, a 2008 TV series. Season 1, episode 06, "Max Out"
Scream of the Banshee, a 2011 TV movie
Femme Fatales, a 2011–2012 TV series.
Sharknado 2: The Second One, a 2014 TV movie, used as name of airline
Sharknado 3: Oh Hell No!, a 2015 TV movie, used as name of gas station
Sharknado: The 4th Awakens, a 2016 TV movie, used as license plate on Uber car
"Forgotten Evil", a 2017 movie about a young woman that has amnesia. Filmed in Antioch, CA
The Last Sharknado: It's About Time, a 2018 TV movie, as a fictional Wild West town and train line
The Edge of Sleep, a horror-mystery podcast starring Markiplier

Other uses
 Nepenthes 'Santa Mira', a cultivar of the carnivorous plant genus Nepenthes